Solo is a 2011 Telugu language romantic family drama  film written and directed by Parasuram. The film features Nara Rohit and Nisha Aggarwal in the lead roles. The film featured music by Mani Sharma. It was remade in Oriya as Haata Dhari Chaaluthaa with Anubhav Mohanty and Barsha Priyadarshini.

Cast

 Nara Rohit as Gautham 
 Nisha Aggarwal as Vaishnavi 
 Prakash Raj as Raghupathi Naidu, Vaishnavi's father 
 Sayaji Shinde as Vishwanath, Ravi's father
 Jayasudha as Vaishnavi's aunt
 Ali as James Cameron
 Srinivasa Reddy as Gautham's friend
 Rao Ramesh as Gautham's foster uncle cum boss
 M.S. Narayana as Dharma
 Vishnuvardhan as Vishnu, Gautham's friend
 Ravi Prakash as Ravi, Vaishnavi's would-be	
 Swapnika as Vaishnavi's friend
 Pavitra Lokesh as Vaishnavi's mother
 Praveen	
 Gundu Sudarshan
 Ranganath
 Fish Venkat		
 Mumaith Khan

Satellite rights
The satellite rights of the film were acquired by MAA TV for  8.75 crore. The film opened to mixed reviews and became an average grosser at box-office.

Soundtrack
The music for the movie was composed by Mani Sharma. The audio was released in Hyderabad on 22 October 2011 by Chandrababu Naidu and Released on Aditya Music.

References

External links

2011 films
Indian drama films
2010s Telugu-language films
Films scored by Mani Sharma
Telugu films remade in other languages
2011 drama films
Films directed by Parasuram